Buter is a Dutch surname. Notable people with the surname include:

Cobie Buter (born 1946), Dutch swimmer
Piet Buter (born 1950), Dutch football coach
Yvonne Buter (born 1959), Dutch field hockey player

See also
Buiter

Dutch-language surnames